Björn Olof August Landström (21 April 1917, in Kuopio, Finland – 7 January 2002, in Helsinki) was a Swedish-speaking Finnish artist, writer, graphic designer, illustrator and researcher.  He also staged and directed the theater.

In 1961 he became internationally famous with his book The Ship, which was translated into several languages.  Other notable works are Bold Voyages and Great Explorers (1964), Ships of the Pharaohs: 4000 Years of Egyptian Shipbuilding (1970), and The Royal Warship Vasa (1980).

External links 
 

1917 births
2002 deaths
People from Kuopio
Finnish writers in Swedish
Finnish artists